War All the Time may refer to:

 War All the Time (Thursday album), 2003
 "War All the Time" (song), the title track
 War All the Time (Poison Idea album), 1987
 War All the Time, a poetry collection by Charles Bukowski